"What Are You Doing the Rest of Your Life?" is a song with lyrics written by Alan Bergman and Marilyn Bergman and original music written by Michel Legrand for the 1969 film The Happy Ending. The song was nominated for an Academy Award for Best Original Song but lost out to "Raindrops Keep Fallin' on My Head".

The same title was used 25 years earlier by Ted Koehler and Burton Lane for their song for the 1944 film Hollywood Canteen. A Ted Weems recording of 1938 also has an identical title.

Background
Alan Bergman would recall that after Michel Legrand had written eight melodies which were somehow not viable for the film, Marilyn Bergman suggested the opening line "What are you doing the rest of your life?", and Legrand then completed the song's melody based on that phrase. Marilyn Bergman would later comment on the dual meanings of the phrase "What are you doing the rest of your life?" to the film: its title alludes to the marriage proposal Mary Spencer (played by Jean Simmons) received and accepted sixteen years earlier but in the context of Mary's present-day angst, the question is now one Mary must ask herself.

Cover Versions
"What Are You Doing the Rest of Your Life?" was sung in The Happy Ending by Michael Dees whose version was included on the film's soundtrack album. 
The first evident "outside" cover was by Barbra Streisand who recorded the song on 24 September 1969 in the first session for her intended album The Singer, with the track having a single release 26 October 1969. After two later sessions – in respectively March and April 1970 – Streisand had recorded a total of eight tracks toward The Singer, only to have Clive Davis shelve the project in favor of an album which was soft rock rather than easy listening, with Streisand cutting the first tracks for what would be her 1971 album release Stoney End on 29 July 1970. "What Are You Doing the Rest of Your Life?" was utilized as the B-side of Streisand's #1 hit "The Way We Were" released in 1973, and was included on the 1974 album release The Way We Were.
Although the Streisand version drew no evident attention in its original single release, "What Are You Doing the Rest of Your Life?" did reach the Easy Listening Top 40 ranking in Billboard – with a #40 peak – via a January 1970 recording by veteran vocalist Jaye P. Morgan, whose version served as the title cut for her first album release in eight years (and her last until 1976). 
Also in 1970 "What Are You Doing the Rest of Your Life?" was recorded by Della Reese for her album Right Now: the 9 November 1997 broadcast of the CBS series Touched by an Angel featured Reese's character; the angel Tess, singing the song in the guise of a supperclub singer. 
"What Are Doing the Rest of Your Life?" was also recorded by Dusty Springfield in 1970, in the July sessions at Trident Studios (Soho) for her See All Her Faces album, but despite Springfield having had a Top 40 hit with the Michel Legrand first Oscar-winning composition "The Windmills of Your Mind" her version of "What Are You Doing the Rest of Your Life?" was cut from her upcoming album without being mixed, remaining "in the can" until 1994 when Philips Records put together the four volume box set Dusty: The Legend Of Dusty Springfield with a completed recording of "What Are You Doing the Rest of Your Life?" being included on the disc devoted to "Rarities" (the track was first released earlier in the year as a bonus on a CD single which paired Springfield's hits "Goin' Back" and "Son-of-a Preacher Man"). In 2006 Springfield's version of "What Are You Doing the Rest of Your Life?" was featured in a 60-second commercial for diamonds – sponsored by the Diamond Trading Company – which aired on American television, in cinemas and online.
In 1972 Sarah Vaughan recorded "What Are You Doing the Rest of Your Life?" for the album Sarah Vaughan with Michel Legrand on which Legrand acted as arranger and conductor. The track would win Legrand the 1972 Grammy Award for Best Instrumental Arrangement Accompanying a Vocalist. More than thirty years later, Billy Childs, Gil Goldstein, and Heitor Pereira won the 2006 Grammy Award for the same category for a version performed by trumpeter Chris Botti and vocalist Sting on Botti's 2005 album To Love Again.

Other cover versions

Shirley Bassey - album Something (1970)
Pat Boone - B-side of single release "Now I'm Saved" (1970)
John Davidson - album Everything is Beautiful (1970)
Bill Evans - From Left to Right (1970); Blue in Green: The Concert in Canada (1974); and other recorded versions
Robert Goulet - album Robert Goulet Sings Today's Greatest Hits (1970)
Peggy Lee - album Bridge Over Troubled Water (1970)
Diana Ross - album Everything Is Everything (1970)
Scott Walker - album 'Til the Band Comes In (1970)
Andy Williams - album The Andy Williams Show (1970)
Vince Hill - album Look Around (1971)
Jack Jones - album Jack Jones Sings Michel Legrand  (1971)
Johnny Mathis - albums Love Story (1971) and How Do You Keep the Music Playing? (1993)
John Rowles - album Saying Goodbyes (1971)
Chris Connor - album Sketches (1972)
Carmen McRae - album The Great American Songbook (1972)
Acker Bilk - album Some of My Favourite Things (1973)
Frank Sinatra - album Some Nice Things I've Missed (1974)
Anita O'Day - albums I Get a Kick Out of You (1975); A Song For You (1984)
Jimmy Roselli - album Love Love Love (1975)
Mel Tormé - album  Live at the Maisonette (1975)
Bill Hayes - album From Me to You with Love (1976)
Roger Williams - album Evergreen (1977)
Joe Pass - album Virtuoso No. 4 (1983, recorded in 1973)
Abbey Lincoln - album Golden Lady (1980)
Julie Andrews - album Love Julie (1987)
Michel Legrand - Michel Plays Legrand (1994); Michel Legrand by Michel Legrand (2002)
Laura Fygi - album Watch What Happens When Laura Fygi Meets Michel Legrand (1997)
Carol Welsman - album Swing Ladies, Swing! A Tribute to Singers of the Swing Era (1999)
Jessye Norman - album Sings Michel Legrand (2000)
Michael Feinstein - album With a Song in My Heart (2001)
Christine Andreas - album Here's to the Ladies (2003)
Michael Bolton - album Vintage (2003)
Alison Moyet - album Voice (2004)
Liane Carroll - album Up & Down (2011)
Sinne Eeg - album Face the Music (2014)

References

External links
 "Alan and Marilyn Bergman Keep the Music Playing", interview (10:12) with the Bergmans about the song on NPR, August 21, 2007
 , from Playboy After Dark, May 5, 1970

1969 songs
Love themes
Songs written for films
Songs with music by Michel Legrand
Songs with lyrics by Alan Bergman
Songs with lyrics by Marilyn Bergman
Grammy Award for Best Instrumental Arrangement Accompanying Vocalist(s)